This article lists the monarchs of Thailand from the foundation of the Sukhothai Kingdom in 1238 until the present day.

Titles and naming conventions

In the Sukhothai Kingdom prior to political association with Ayutthaya, the monarch used the title Pho Khun ('Father'), while monarchs whose reigns ended disgracefully or was otherwise dishonorable are referred to by the title Phaya ('Lord'). Beginning with monarchs of the Ayutthaya Kingdom, thanandon, the system of Thai royal ranks and titles, determines the style of the monarch's full regnal name, which consists of two or three central parts:
 The first part of the name is Phra Bat Somdet Phra ('the King'). If the monarch was not crowned, Phra Bat is omitted. If the monarch's reign ended disgracefully or was otherwise dishonorable, Somdet is additionally omitted.
 The second part of the name is the monarch's bestowed regnal names, which may or may not include their birth name, and may include more names than how the monarch is referred to by historians. Maharaj ('the Great') is an example of one of these additional names.
 The third part of the name is Chao Yu Hua ('His Majesty'), which is sometimes fully omitted. Yu Hua alone is also sometimes omitted, in which case Chao is moved to the end of the first part of the name.

A monarch's regnal name may be different from their birth name, their name as uparaja (viceroy), or their posthumous name and/or historical style. For example, the first king of the Chakri dynasty was born Thongduang, ruled as Ramathibodi, but is referred to posthumously as Phutthayotfa Chulalok the Great (Rama I). This list refers to the monarchs by their name as most commonly used by traditional historians, usually a section of the regnal name unless otherwise indicated.

Western nations referred to the monarch as the "King of Siam", regardless of Thai titles, since the initiation of relations in the 16th century. Mongkut (Rama IV) was the first monarch to adopt the title in its Western capacity, at the same time the name Siam was first used in an international treaty. The kingdom's name changed to Thailand on 24 June 1939, then briefly back to Siam in 1946, before being permanently changed back to Thailand in 1948; the monarch's Western title changed accordingly.

Sukhothai Kingdom (1238–1438)
Tai peoples migrated into Mainland Southeast Asia in the 8th–10th centuries. In the years after, Northern Thai groups established various mueang, among them Chiang Saen, which evolved into larger states, such as Ngoenyang. However, it was not until the decline of the Khmer Empire in the 13th century that a Central Thai kingdom, politically and culturally related to modern Siam or Thailand, was first founded.

Phra Ruang dynasty (1238–1438) 
The Phra Ruang dynasty was the first and only royal family to rule the Sukhothai Kingdom, the first Central Thai state. Established by Si Inthrathit in 1238, who declared independence from the Khmer Empire, the family laid the foundations for Thai dominance in mainland Southeast Asia. Under Ram Khamhaeng the Great, the initial Thai script was invented and Therāvada Buddhism was established as the state religion of Siam. 

The dynasty is named after the Traiphum Phra Ruang, a philosophical Buddhist cosmology book written by Maha Thammaracha I. Under Maha Thammaracha I, the kingdom was invaded by Ayutthaya, a neighboring Thai state, and Sukhothai became a tributary under Maha Thammaracha II.

In the Sukhothai Kingdom, the king ruled from the city of Sukhothai, while the heir presumptive would occasionally be named by the king to rule in Si Satchanalai as uparaja, or viceroy. In 1438, Ayutthaya annexed Sukhothai at the death of Maha Thammaracha IV when Borommarachathirat II of Ayutthaya installed his son, Prince Ramesuan, as uparaja. After unification with Ayutthaya, the tradition of uparaja would evolve into the Front Palace system.

Ayutthaya Kingdom (1351–1767)

1st Uthong dynasty (1351–1370)

1st Suphannaphum dynasty (1370–1388)

2nd Uthong dynasty (1388–1409)

2nd Suphannaphum dynasty (1409–1569)

Sukhothai dynasty (1569–1629)

Prasat Thong dynasty (1629–1688)

Ban Phlu Luang dynasty (1688–1767)

Thonburi Kingdom (1767–1782)

Thonburi dynasty (1767–1782)

Rattanakosin Kingdom (1782–present)

Chakri dynasty (1782–present)

Timeline of monarchs

Family Tree of the Thai Monarchy

See also

Family tree of Thai monarchs
Monarchy of Thailand
List of rulers of Lan Na
List of Thai royal consorts
Rama (Kings of Thailand)
Chakri dynasty
Regent of Thailand
Thailand

Notes

Bibliography

 

Thai monarchs
Thailand
Monarchs